William Arthur Galston (born January 17, 1946) holds the Ezra K. Zilkha Chair in Governance Studies and is a senior fellow at the Brookings Institution; he joined the think tank on January 1, 2006. Formerly the Saul Stern Professor and Dean at the School of Public Policy at the University of Maryland and a professor of political science at the University of Texas, Austin, Galston specializes in issues of U.S. public philosophy and political institutions.

Family
He is the son of Yale University plant physiologist Arthur Galston.

Career
He was deputy assistant for domestic policy to U.S. President Bill Clinton (January 1993 – May 1995).  He has also been employed by the presidential campaigns of Al Gore (1988, 2000), Walter Mondale, and John B. Anderson. Since 1995, Galston has served as a founding member of the Board of the National Campaign to Prevent Teen Pregnancy and as chair of the Campaign's Task Force on Religion and Public Values.

Galston was in the United States Marine Corps, serving as a sergeant.  He was educated at Cornell, where he was a member of the Telluride House, and the University of Chicago, where he got his Ph.D. He then taught for nearly a decade in the Department of Government at the University of Texas. From 1998 until 2005 he was professor of public policy at the University of Maryland.  Later he was executive director for the National Commission on Civic Renewal. Galston founded, with support from The Pew Charitable Trusts, the Center for Information and Research on Civic Learning and Engagement.  He was also director of the Institute for Philosophy and Public Policy, both located at the University of Maryland.

He has written on questions of political and moral philosophy, U.S. politics and public policy, having produced eight books and more than one hundred articles. His most recent book is Public Matters: Politics, Policy, and Religion in the 21st Century (Rowman & Littlefield, 2005). Galston is also a co-author of Democracy at Risk: How Political Choices Undermine Citizen Participation and What We Can Do About It, published by the Brookings Press.

Galston became an op-ed columnist for the Wall Street Journal in 2013.  In 2014, he continued public commentary on partisan politics.

Publications

References

External links
 
 The Brookings Institution profile
 

Living people
Place of birth missing (living people)
American political philosophers
1946 births
Jewish American academics
Jewish philosophers
20th-century American Jews
21st-century American Jews
Political scientists who studied under Leo Strauss
United States Marines
Cornell University alumni
University of Chicago alumni
University of Maryland, College Park faculty
University of Texas faculty
Clinton administration personnel
Fellows of the American Academy of Arts and Sciences
Philosophers from Texas
Philosophers from Illinois
Philosophers from Maryland
Brookings Institution people